
Year 408 BC was a year of the pre-Julian Roman calendar. At the time, it was known as the Year of the Tribunate of Iullus, Ahala and Cossus (or, less frequently, year 346 Ab urbe condita). The denomination 408 BC for this year has been used since the early medieval period, when the Anno Domini calendar era became the prevalent method in Europe for naming years.

Events

By place

Persian Empire 
 King Darius II of Persia decides to continue the war against Athens and give support to the Spartans. His wife, Parysatis, persuades him to appoint his younger son, Cyrus, as satrap (governor) of Lydia, Phrygia, and Cappadocia and commander in chief of the Achaemenian forces in Asia Minor in place of Tissaphernes.
 Tissaphernes' influence is limited to the satrapy of Caria. Darius II also gives Cyrus funds to re-create the Spartan fleet and sends him to Sardis with instructions to increase Persian support for Sparta. Cyrus begins to collect an army of mercenaries (including Greeks) for his own ends.

Greece 
 Alcibiades enters Athens in triumph after an absence of 7 years. He leads the religious procession from Athens to Eleusis, thus atoning for his alleged impiety in 415 BC when he was held to have joined in profaning the Sacred Mysteries. Alcibiades is appointed commander-in-chief with autocratic powers and leaves for Samos to rejoin his fleet.
 The Spartan admiral Lysander arrives at Ephesus in autumn and builds up a great fleet with help from the new Persian satrap, Cyrus.
 At the Panhellenic gathering at Olympia, the philosopher Gorgias speaks out against the Spartan alliance with Persia.
 In 408 BC, the three city-states of the island of Rhodes (Ialysos, Kamiros, Lindos) unite and create the homonymous city on the northernmost part of the island.

By topic

Literature 
 Euripides' plays Orestes and The Phoenician Women are performed. Euripides then leaves Athens in dissatisfaction and travels to the court of Archelaus I of Macedon at the King's invitation.
</onlyinclude>

Births 
 Eudoxus of Cnidus, Greek astronomer, mathematician, physician, scholar and adherent of Pythagoras (d. c. 355 BC)
 Dion, tyrant of Syracuse (d. c. 354 BC)

Deaths 
Hippodamus of Miletus, Greek urban planner and polymath (b. 498 BC)

References